Pedro General Taduran Jr. (born 29 October 1996) is a Filipino professional boxer who held the IBF mini-flyweight from 2019 to 2021.

In September 2021, he was ranked as the world's ninth best strawweight by The Ring and tenth best by the TBRB.

Personal life
Taduran is the eighth of nine siblings. Two of his brothers also took up boxing.

Professional career

Early career
Taduran made his professional debut against Nathaniel Marasigan on May 16, 2015. He won the fight by a first-round technical knockout. He amassed a 12-1 record over the course of the next three years, with eight stoppage victories, winning the vacant PBF and PG&AB mini-flyweight title along the way.

Taduran was scheduled to challenge the reigning WBC strawweight champion Wanheng Menayothin on August 29, 2018. The fight was contested in Nakhon Sawan, Thailand, which was Taduran's first professional fight outside of Philippines. Wanheng won the fight by unanimous decision, with scores of 118-108, 115-111 and 117-110. The wide decision was further accentuated by the two points that Taduran was deducted for low blows.

Taduran was scheduled to defend his PG&AB mini-flyweight title against Jeffrey Galero on December 8, 2018. He won the fight by a second-round knockout.

IBF mini-flyweight champion

Taduran vs. Salva
Taduran was scheduled to fight Samuel Salva for the vacant IBF mini-flyweight title on September 7, 2019 at the Jurado Hall in Taguig, Philippines. It was the first time since 1925 that a world title fight between two Filipinos was contested in Philippines. Taduran had a poor start to the fight as he was knocked down in the first round. He began to take over from the third round onward, when Salva began to have trouble breathing. After the fourth round, Salva remained seated on his stool and signaled to his throat. He had oxygen administered to him in the ring and was soon stretchered out. Accordingly, as Salva was unable to resume fighting, Taduran was awarded the win.

Taduran vs. Valladares
Taduran was scheduled to make the first defense of his IBF world title against the #1 ranked IBF light flyweight Daniel Valladares on February 1, 2020 at the Jardin Cerveza Expo in Guadalupe, Mexico. The fight was ruled a majority draw, by technical decision, with two judges scoring the bout as 38-38, while the third judge awarded Valladares a 39-37 scorecard. The fight was stopped after the fourth round, as Valladares was unable to continue fighting due to a cut over the right eye. Despite the short nature of the fight, BoxingScene described it as a "Fight of the Year contender".

Taduran vs. Cuarto
In November 2020, rumors surfaced that Taduran would make his second IBF title defense against Rene Mark Cuarto, which would be his second time in his career that he fought his countryman in a world title bout. Although the fight was initially targeted for December 2020 or January 2021, the ongoing COVID-19 pandemic postponed the fight until February 27, 2021. Although Taduran began to take over in the latter rounds, Cuarto had built a large enough lead to win the fight. Cuarto slipped on the canvas and nearly fell through the ropes in the 12th round, and was able to avoid a knockdown call. Cuarto won the fight by unanimous decision, with all three judges scoring the bout 115-113 in his favor.

Taduran vs. Cuarto II
An immediate rematch for the IBF mini-flyweight title was booked for January 29, 2022, to take place at the Digos Arena in Davao del Sur, Philippines. The title bout was officially approved by the IBF on January 12. The fight was eventually postponed for February 6. He lost the fight by a seventh-round technical decision. The fight was stopped due to a cut on Taduran's forehead, which resulted from an accidental clash of heads. Two of the judges scored the fight 65–64 and 66–64 for Cuarto, while the third judge scored the fight an even 65–65. Taduran was knocked down in the second and the sixth round, and was deducted two points in the third round for a headbutt.

Professional boxing record

See also
List of mini-flyweight boxing champions
History of boxing in the Philippines

References

External links

Pedro Taduran - Profile, News Archive & Current Rankings at Box.Live

1996 births
Living people
Sportspeople from Albay
Filipino male boxers
Mini-flyweight boxers
World mini-flyweight boxing champions
International Boxing Federation champions